Thomas Lascelles may refer to:

Thomas Lascelles (engineer), Chief Royal Engineer, 1742–1751; Surveyor-General of the Ordnance, 1742–1750
Thomas Lascelles (died 1697), English Member of Parliament
Thomas Lascelles (1624–1658), officer in the Commonwealth’s army
Thomas Lascelles (born 1982), son of Jeremy Lascelles

See also Tommy Lascelles.